Pat Atencio, also called Koo Peen (English: "Mountain Rock"; January 22, 1932 – January 15, 2009), was a San Ildefonso Pueblo painter.

Biography 
Pat Atencio was the son of Benjamin Atencio and painter Isabel M. Montoya. His mother's cousin was Maria Martinez. His brothers Gilbert Benjamin Atencio and Tony Atencio were also artists, as were his sisters Helen Gutierrez and Angelita Sanchez.

He studied at the Santa Fe Indian School and exhibited his work across the country. Some of his works are in the permanent collection of institutions including the Museum of New Mexico and the National Museum of the American Indian.

See also 

 List of Native American artists

References

External links 
 Works by Pat Atencio at the Smithsonion National Museum of the American Indian

1932 births
2009 deaths
20th-century American painters
20th-century indigenous painters of the Americas
Native American painters
Pueblo artists
Painters from New Mexico
20th-century Native Americans
21st-century Native Americans